Polonca Kovač, true name Magdalena Kovač, (born 19 February 1937) is a Slovene children's writer and translator. She has published numerous children's books and is also known for her translations for young readers, most notably the entire collection of Grimms' Fairy Tales and The Diary of Anne Frank.

Kovač was born in Ljubljana in 1937. She studied Comparative literature at the University of Ljubljana and worked as a teacher and a free-lance writer. She started publishing children's books in 1975 and is a very prolific writer with a broad range of themes and styles. In 2009 she received the Levstik Award for her lifetime achievement in children's literature.

Published works

  (Little Beasts from the Eternal Road), 1975
  (The Chatty Tortoise), 1975
  (Jakec and Uncle Rerigerator), 1976
  (There is Never Too Many Andrews), 1977
  (Uncle Refrigerator, the Drum of Luck and the Canary), 1978
  (A Rainy Day is a Wonderful Day), 1979
  (A Dictionary of Borrowed Words), 1980
  (Ursulas are Flawless), 1980
  (Games to Pass Your Time), 1982
  (Five Puppies Looking for the Right One), 1982
  (Stories from A to Z), 1982
  (The Daylight Firefly), 1983
  (Little Špelas), 1983
  1+1=5 (The Space Egg or 1+1=5), 1985
  (The Troubles and Messages of Paffy the Dog), 1986
  (Muffy's Dreams), 1987
  (The Little Mouse), 1989
  (On Two Sensitive Girls), 1989
  (On Crocodiles, Chickens and Thinking Games), 1989
  (Anyone Have a Clue), 1990
  (In Town), 1991
  (The Young Witche's Herbs), 1995
  (Dwarfs on Smov Hill), 1996
  (Where Do Stories Come From), 1998
  (Kaja and Her Family), 1999
  (Little Teddy), 2000
  (An Outing With a Story), 2001
  (The Year of Birds), 2005

References

Slovenian children's writers
Slovenian women children's writers
Slovenian translators
Living people
1937 births
Levstik Award laureates
University of Ljubljana alumni
Writers from Ljubljana